The men's freestyle 86 kilograms is a competition featured at the 2019 World Wrestling Championships, and was held in Nur-Sultan, Kazakhstan on 21 and 22 September.

Results
Legend
F — Won by fall
WO — Won by walkover

Finals

Top half

Section 1

Section 2

Bottom half

Section 3

Section 4

Repechage

References

External links
Official website

Men's freestyle 86 kg